The Ministry of Education and Youth (MoE) is a government ministry of Belize. The ministry's offices are located in the west block, in Belmopan, Cayo District.

References

External links

 Ministry of Education and Youth

Education and Youth
Belize